Uğurcan Yazğılı (born 9 April 1999) is a Turkish football player who currently plays as a defender for Konyaspor.

Professional career
Yazğılı began his senior career with Bucaspor in the TFF Second League. On 12 July 2019, Yazğılı signed a professional contract with Kasımpaşa. Yazğılı made his professional debut with Kasımpaşa in a 2-1 Süper Lig loss to Kayserispor on 12 May 2019. On 28 January 2022, he transferred to Konyaspor signing a 3.5 year contract.

References

External links
 
 
 
 

1999 births
Living people
People from Şanlıurfa Province
Turkish footballers
Turkey youth international footballers
Bucaspor footballers
Kasımpaşa S.K. footballers
Konyaspor footballers
Süper Lig players
TFF First League players
TFF Second League players
Association football defenders